Zachary Charles Hill (born December 28, 1979) is an American multi-instrumentalist and visual artist. He is best known as the drummer and co-producer of the groups Death Grips and the I.L.Y's, and as the drummer of math rock band Hella.

Art
In addition to music, Hill is also a visual artist.  He published a fully illustrated book, Destroying Yourself is Too Accessible, which included the Zach Hill and Holy Smokes album Masculine Drugs released in 2004 on TNI Books and Suicide Squeeze Records.

The Sacramento, California, art space Fools Foundation ran an exhibition of Hill's art, titled "Poltergeist", from April 1 to April 29, 2006. Parts of the exhibit are visible in the photos accompanying Hill's article in the August 2006 issue of Modern Drummer and on the Fools Foundation website.

Film
Hill was said to be working on an original feature film in 2013, which was confirmed to feature late actress Karen Black in a leading role. However, she had died before the film could come into full fruition. A shortened excerpt of the footage was posted on the Death Grips YouTube account in October 2015 in a 15-minute video entitled "Bottomless Pit". It has been rumored that either Death Grips or Hill's side-project, the I.L.Y's, would be involved with the soundtrack of the film as well.

Discography

Solo releases 
 Astrological Straits (2008)
 Face Tat (2010)

as Xach Hill
 Lil Scuzzy (2011)

With Death Grips

Albums 
 The Money Store (2012)
 No Love Deep Web (2012)
 Government Plates (2013)
 Fashion Week (2015)
 The Powers That B (2015)
 Bottomless Pit (2016)
 Year of the Snitch (2018)

Mixtapes 
 Exmilitary (2011)

Extended plays 
 Death Grips (2011)
 Interview 2016 (2016)
 Steroids (Crouching Tiger Hidden Gabber Megamix) (2017)
 Gmail and the Restraining Orders (2019)

With Hella

Albums 
 Hold Your Horse Is (2002)
 The Devil Isn't Red (2004)
 Church Gone Wild/Chirpin' Hard (2005)
 There's No 666 in Outer Space (2007)
 Tripper (2011)

Extended plays 
 Leather Diamond (2001)
 Falam Dynasty (2002)
 Bitches Ain't Shit but Good People (2003)
 Total Bugs Bunny on Wild Bass (2003)
 Acoustics (2004)
 Concentration Face & Homeboy (2005)
 Acoustics (2006)
 Santa's Little Hella (2013)

DVDs 
 Portals (2008)

Split albums 
with Dilute
 Live (2003)
with Four Tet 
 Split Seven Inch Divorce Series 1 (2004)

With Bygones 
 By- (2009)
 Spiritual Bankruptcy (2010)

With Flössin 
 Lead Singer (2004)
 Live at Overlap 01 (2006)
 Serpents (2009)
 White Anaconda and the Rainbow Boa (2011)

With Holy Smokes 
as Zach Hill & Holy Smokes
 Masculine Drugs / Destroying Yourself Is Too Accessible (2004)

as Holy Smokes
 Talk to Your Kids About Gangs (2006)

With the I.L.Y's 
 I've Always Been Good at True Love (2015)
 Scum With Boundaries (2016)
 Bodyguard (2017)

With Marnie Stern 
 In Advance of the Broken Arm (2007)
 This Is It and I Am It and You Are It and So Is That and He Is It and She Is It and It Is It and That Is That (2008)
 Marnie Stern (2010)

With Mick Barr 
 Shred Earthship (2006)
 Volume 2 (2007)
 Volthree (2020)

With Omar Rodríguez-López 
 Mantra Hiroshima (2010)
 Telesterion (2011)

as El Grupo Nuevo de Omar Rodriguez Lopez
 Cryptomnesia (2009)

With Spoek Mathambo 
 Put Some Red on It (2011)
 Father Creeper (2012)

With Team Sleep 
 Team Sleep (2005)

With Undo K From Hot 
 G.A.S. Get a Star (2021)
 Dumb Little Fucker (2021)
 Remnants of Chris (2022)

Other bands and collaborations

Other appearances 

 Various Artists (Hella) – If the Twenty-First Century Didn't Exist It Would Be Necessary to Invent It (2002)
 Various Artists (Team Sleep) – The Matrix Reloaded (Music from and Inspired by the Motion Picture) (2003)
 Various Artists (Hella) – You've Got Your Orders – Volume One (2003)
 Various Artists (Les Claypool) – Under the Influence: A Jam Band Tribute to Lynyrd Skynyrd (2004)
 Various Artists (Hella) – Slaying Since 1996 (2006)
 Various Artists (The Ladies) – Thankful CD (2006)
 Various Artists (Diamond Watch Wrists) – Warp20 (Recreated) (2009)
 Various Artists – Revival Drum Comp (2010)
 Various Artists – Zum Audio Vol 4 Digital (2021)

References

External links
Official Myspace page
The Zach Hill Archive
Pitchfork interview Zach Hill on Death Grips
Fools Foundation Art Exhibit April 2006
Zach Hill at exclaim!

Suicide Squeeze Records artists
1979 births
Living people
Musicians from Sacramento, California
Place of birth missing (living people)
American rock drummers
Goon Moon members
Anticon
20th-century American drummers
Daron Malakian and Scars on Broadway members
Amen (American band) members
Hella (band) members
Team Sleep members
21st-century American drummers
El Grupo Nuevo de Omar Rodriguez Lopez members